Yīn is a Chinese surname. It is derived from the name of the capital of the Shang dynasty. A 2013 study found that it was the 126th most common surname, being shared by 1,470,000 people or 0.110% of the population, with Jiangsu being the province with the most. It is the 74th name on the Hundred Family Surnames poem.

History 
The surname Yīn can date to the fall of the Shang (Yin) dynasty in 1046 BCE. After the dynasty's collapse, surviving ruling family members collectively changed their surname from 子(pinyin: zǐ; Wade-Giles: tzu; the royal surname) to the name of their fallen capital and country, Yin (殷). The family remained members of the aristocratic class. They often provided administrative services to the Zhou dynasty who succeeded them.

Following the fall of the Shang dynasty, Viscount of Wei (Wei Zi 微子), older brother of Di Xin, the last king of the Shang dynasty, was given the territory around the old Shang capital, and established the State of Song (宋國). Rites for the Shang (Yin) kings continued to 286 BCE.

The surname is still found in northern and northeastern China. There is a diaspora in the area south of the Yangtze River near the Wu region of China, and after the time of the Qing dynasty, immigration to Taiwan and Southeast Asia. Yin settlements are found south-west of Tonghui in Gansu Province, in Shandong Province and in the Pearl River Delta area. A 2013 study found that it was the 126th most common surname, being shared by 1,470,000 people or 0.110% of the population, with Jiangsu being the province with the most.

Notable people 
 Yin Xian (殷羡), general of the Jin dynasty (266–420)
 Yin Hao (殷浩), general of the Jin dynasty
 Yin Zhongkan (殷仲堪), intellectual of the Northern and Southern dynasties era
 Yin Chengzong (殷承宗), pianist and composer of the Yellow River Piano Concerto
Johnny Yin (殷正洋; born 1961), Taiwanese singer, three-time winner of the Golden Melody Awards
 Yin Tao (殷桃, born 1979) is a Chinese actress, winner of the three biggest industry awards including the Feitian Awards, Golden Eagle Awards and the Magnolia Awards

References

External links 
 Yutopian
 China knowledge
 Hudong website

Chinese-language surnames
Individual Chinese surnames
Shang dynasty